The 2010 Tidjelabine bombing occurred on April 7, 2010 when an explosive bomb detonated against a patrol of the Gendarmerie Nationale in the town of Tidjelabine, Boumerdès Province, Algeria killing 2 and injuring 5. The Al-Qaeda Organization in the Islamic Maghreb is suspected as being responsible.

See also
 Terrorist bombings in Algeria
 List of terrorist incidents, 2010

References

Boumerdès Province
Suicide car and truck bombings in Algeria
Mass murder in 2010
Terrorist incidents in Algeria
Terrorist incidents in Algeria in 2010
2010 murders in Algeria
Islamic terrorism in Algeria